"My Time" is the second single from Fabolous' fifth album Loso's Way (2009). The song features Def Jam newcomer Jeremih, who also co-wrote the track with Fabolous. Jeremih, being his second mainstream appearance, utilizes Auto-Tune during his performance on the hook. The song "Money Goes, Honey Stay" featuring Jay-Z is featured as a B-Side for this single.

Music video

The video for "My Time" released on May 28, 2009. At the end of the video, there's a snippet of "Everything, Everyday, Everywhere" Which is one of Fabolous'  singles.  Jeremih does not appear in the video. The song is cut by about two minutes for the video to remove Jeremih's verse. Ryan Leslie appears in the video for his intro in "Everything, Everyday, Everywhere".

Miscellaneous

 This song is played before games at Yankee Stadium.
 The song was used in the commercial for the RBI World Series on MLB Network.
 The song was used in the America's Best Dance Crew season 4 premiere as the intro for the season.
 The song was used as the theme song for the 2009 NBA Draft.
 The song was featured in the introduction video before Cleveland Cavaliers home games during the 2009–10 season.
 The song is featured in the introduction video before Toronto Raptors home games during the 2010–11 season.
The song was featured in the introduction video before New Orleans Hornets home games during the 2009–10 season.
 This song was played during games at the 2010 ACC baseball tournament.
 This song was used as the theme song for a New York Knicks season preview program on the MSG Network before the start of the 2009–10 NBA season.
 This song was used as the theme song for EAW's Pain for Pride II.
 This song is used during halftime at home games for the Alabama Crimson Tide.
 This song was used during the 2011 ESPY Awards during the "Best Team" award video.
 This song was used to introduce the Fighting Illini student section, the Orange Krush, during 2009–10 basketball season.
 This song is used by Milwaukee Brewers pitcher Yovani Gallardo as his pre-game warm up song as the team takes the field.
 This song was used by Amir Khan as the first part of his entrance song in which he was facing Danny Garcia.
 This song is used by UFC fighter Ronaldo "Jacare" Souza as his entrance song. It's also used as an entrance song by Japanese MMA star, Kyoji Horiguchi.

Charts

External links
 Fabolous featuring Jeremih - My Time Music Video
 http://www.contactmusic.com/videos.nsf/stream/fabolous-my-time
Official Music Video

References

2009 singles
Fabolous songs
Jeremih songs
Songs written by Kevin Cossom
Music videos directed by Erik White
Song recordings produced by the Runners
Songs written by Fabolous
2009 songs
Def Jam Recordings singles
Songs written by Andrew Harr
Songs written by Jeremih